A complementary currency is a currency or medium of exchange that is not necessarily a national currency, but that is thought of as supplementing or complementing national currencies.  Complementary currencies are usually not legal tender and their use is  based on agreement between the parties exchanging the currency. According to Jérôme Blanc of Laboratoire d'Économie de la Firme et des Institutions, complementary currencies aim to protect, stimulate or orientate the economy. They may also be used to advance particular social, environmental, or political goals.

When speaking about complementary currencies, a number of overlapping and often interchangeable terms are in use: local or community currencies are complementary currencies used within a locality or other form of community (such as business-based or online communities); regional currencies are similar to local currencies, but are used within a larger geographical region; and sectoral currencies are complementary currencies used within a single economic sector, such as education or health care. Many private currencies are complementary currencies issued by private businesses or organizations. Other terms include alternative currency, auxiliary currency, and microcurrency. Mutual credit is a form of alternative currency, and thus any form of lending that does not go through the banking system can be considered a form of alternative currency. Barters are another type of alternative currency. These are actually exchange systems, which trade only items, without the use of any currency whatsoever. Finally, LETS is a special form of barter that trades points for items. One point stands for one worker-hour of work, and is thus a time-based currency.

Purposes
Current complementary currencies have often been designed intentionally to address specific issues, for example to increase financial stability. Most complementary currencies have multiple purposes and/or are intended to address multiple issues. They can be useful for communities that do not have access to financial capital, and for adjusting peoples' spending behavior. The 2006 Annual Report of the Worldwide Database of Complementary Currency Systems presented a survey of 150 complementary currency systems in which 94 respondents said that "all reasons" were selected, among cooperation, micro/small/medium enterprise development, activating the local market, reducing the need for national currency, and community development.

Aims may include:
 resocialisation and emancipation
 lifeboat currencies
 to increase financial stability
 to reduce carbon emissions, by encouraging localisation of trade and relationships
 to encouraging use of under-used resources
 to recognise the informal economy
 promote local businesses

Advantages
Alternative currencies increase in activity if the local economy slows down, and decrease in activity if the local economy goes up.

Disadvantages
According to professor Nikolaus Läufer's theory, the use of local currencies such as Freigeld can only increase economic activity temporarily. Lengthy use of a local currency will ultimately result in a decline in economic activity and lead to a destabilization of the economy. This is due to the increased circulation velocity of the money as the amount in circulation decreases (as currencies as Freigeld reduce in value rapidly).

Tax
There are some complementary currencies that are regional or global, such as the Community Exchange System, WIR and Friendly Favors, Tibex in the Lazio region in Italy or the proposed global currency terra.

A community currency is a type of complementary currency that has the explicit aim to support and build more equal, connected and sustainable societies. A community currency is designed to be used by a specific group.

Since the advent of Bitcoin on January 3, 2009, cryptocurrency has increased substantially as an alternative currency. Cryptocurrency allows for a trustless means of exchange through the use of decentralized mining, in which computers solve mathematical puzzles first in order to verify the transaction.

Activists
Some complementary currency activists are Belgian ex-banker Bernard Lietaer, British economist Hazel Henderson, Dutch STRO-director Henk van Arkel that developed Cyclos, Qoin initiators Edgar Kampers and Rob van Hilten, Paul Glover of Ithaca HOURS, Margrit Kennedy from Monneta, LETSystem inventor Michael Linton, Time Banking inventor Edgar S. Cahn, Japanese Volunteer Labour Network founder Teruko Mizushima,  Complementary Currency Resource Center coordinator Stephen DeMeulenaere and many others. Lietaer has argued that the world's national currencies are inadequate for the world's business needs, citing how 87 countries have experienced major currency crashes over a 20-year period, and arguing for complementary currencies as a way to protect against these problems. Lietaer has also spoken at an International Reciprocal Trade Association (IRTA) conference about barter.

List of complementary currencies

Other non-regional complementary currencies include:

 American Open Currency Standard (AOCS)
 Commercial credit circuit 
 Community Exchange System (CES) – global exchange network
 Digital gold currency
 Fourth Corner Exchange
 Local Exchange Trading Systems (LETS) – an example of mutual credit, is a type of local currency used in a number of small communities worldwide.
 Rábaközi Tallér
 Sardex, alternative currency used in Sardinia
 Ven – a digital currency used in Hub Culture, a private social network
 WIR Bank – founded in 1934, oriented towards small and mid-sized corporations

See also

 ANCAP
 Barter
 Bancor
 Bearer instrument
 Bernard Lietaer
 Cardano (blockchain platform)
 Collaborative finance
 Commodity money
 Community currency
 Community wealth building
 Conder token
 Credit money
 Cryptocurrency
 Currency substitution
 Cyclos
 Digital currencies
 Digital gold currency
 E.C. Riegel – proposed the Valun Private Enterprise Money System
 Flex dollar
 Freigeld
 LETS
 List of Canadian community currencies
 List of community currencies in the United States
 List of cryptocurrencies
 Local currency
 Local exchange trading system
 Margrit Kennedy
 Paul Glover (activist)
 Patacon
 Private bank
 Sectoral currency
 Silvio Gesell
 Tim Jenkin
 Time Banking
 Tumin
 Urstromtaler
 Ven (currency)
 WIR Bank
 Wörgl experiment
 World currency

References

Further reading
 Glover, Paul. Hometown Money: how to enrich your community with local currency.  Greenplanners, 2013.
 Lietaer, Bernard. The Future of Money. Random House, 2001.
  Raddon, M. Community and money: men and women making change. Montreal: Black Rose Books, 2003.
 Suhr, Dieter (1990). The Neutral Money Network (NeuMoNe): A Critical Analysis of Traditional Money and the Financial Innovation "Neutral Money"

External links

 Community Currency Magazine
 International Journal of Community Currency Research
 Online Database of Complementary Currencies Worldwide
 Social Trade Organisation
 Secure eXchange Protocols 
 Trade Point: Internal currency of Barter platform

Local currencies
Monetary reform
 
Cryptocurrencies